The Boccia Team BC1-2 event at the 2008 Summer Paralympics was held in the Olympic Green Convention Center on 10–12 September.
The preliminary stages consisted of 4 round-robin groups of 3 competitors each. The top two teams in each group qualified for the final stages.
The event was won by the team representing .

Results

Preliminaries

Pool A

 after an extra (fifth) end.

Pool B

Pool C

Pool D

Competition bracket

Entry List

References

Boccia at the 2008 Summer Paralympics